Michael Donnelly is a fictional character from the American soap opera Santa Barbara. He was portrayed by American actor Frank Runyeon from May 26, 1988 to October 14, 1991.

Character history
When Mason Capwell was accused of the murder of Mark McCormick, he left Santa Barbara in search of Mark's true killer. Mason's quest led him to a convent where Michael Donnelly was the main priest. An explosion caused Mason to lose his memory and he was presumed dead, but his wife, Julia Wainwright, showed up at the convent searching for the truth about Mason. Eventually the truth about Mark's killer was revealed, but by that time Father Michael realized he had fallen in love with Julia.

Michael's profession as a priest came to torment him when he heard the confession of serial rapist Zach Kelton. Michael's conscience was troubled, because he wanted to inform the police but was forbidden to do so by the Seal of the Confessional. Zach, fearing that Michael would betray him, kidnapped Julia. Michael rescued Julia, and came to the conclusion he would need to give up the priesthood.

When married couple Laura and Ethan Asher came to town, Michael revealed that he had once had a relationship with Laura and had accidentally killed her child while working as a policeman. Laura forgave Michael, but Ethan was suspicious of Michael and Laura. Another person from Michael's past, Leo Mitchell, arrived in town threatening Michael.  When Leo was killed, Michael was accused of committing the crime, but it turned out that Laura had killed Leo in self-defense.

Michael then had a short relationship with Greta McAdams before moving on to Nikki Alvarez. Cruz Castillo saved Michael and Nikki from being tormented by Kirk Cranston, and the couple started dating and got engaged, but Nikki was murdered by Harland Richards before the wedding. Michael was then hired by Minx Lockridge to find the daughter she had given up many years before. After learning that Minx's daughter was Cassandra Benedict, Michael and Cassandra dated for a while. After Cassandra, Michael became involved with Flame Beaufort, but her suicidal nature ruined their relationship. After that, Michael decided to leave town to get away from bad memories.

References

Further reading
Goudas, John N. "'Santa Barbara's' priest has many temptations." A TimesDaily Entertainment Guide 26 Feb. 1989: 5. Google News. Web. 5 Jan. 2012.
Reichardt, Nancy M. "Frank Runyeon returns to soaps." T.V. Spotlight: The Tuscaloosa News Entertainment Guide 9 Sep. 1988: 9. Google News. Web. 5 Jan. 2012.

Santa Barbara characters
Television characters introduced in 1988